T. Leslie Youd is an American geotechnical engineer and earthquake engineer, specializing in soil liquefaction and ground failure. He currently lives in Orem, Utah.

Education
Youd received his BES in civil engineering from Brigham Young University in 1964. He then attended Iowa State University where he received his PhD in civil engineering in 1967. He performed post doctoral study in soil mechanics and engineering seismology from 1975 to 1976 at Imperial College of Science and Technology in London.

Research
Youd's research has been primarily concerned with the phenomenon of soil liquefaction, and the associated lateral spreading which can occur. Youd has published over 140 research papers. Youd's best-known papers are on the prediction of the magnitude of lateral spreading.

Awards and honors
Youd was elected to the National Academy of Engineering in 2005.

Youd was made an honorary member of the American Society of Civil Engineers in 2006, an honor bestowed upon fewer than 0.2% of its membership. He received the Distinguished Alumni Award in 2011 at Iowa State University.

Patents
Youd earned patent #4,840,230 for a system to retrievably install instruments into a borehole.

References

Place of birth missing (living people)
Year of birth missing (living people)
Living people
Brigham Young University alumni
Brigham Young University faculty
Iowa State University alumni
American civil engineers
Geotechnical engineers
Members of the United States National Academy of Engineering